Querétaro Intercontinental Airport is an international airport located in the municipalities of Colón and El Marqués, Querétaro, Mexico. It handles the national and international air traffic of the city of Querétaro and can also be used as an alternate airport to Mexico City International Airport.

It replaced the Ing. Fernando Espinoza Gutiérrez International Airport, which is no longer operational, in 2004.

The headquarters of regional airline TAR is located here.

It's one of the fastest-growing airports in the country, handling 817,791 passengers in 2021, and 1,151,602 passengers in 2022, an increase of 40.82%.

Airlines and destinations

Passenger

Cargo

Ground transportation information

Taxi: Travellers wishing to take a taxi or van to Querétaro (around US$25) and other cities can take the airport taxi. Some travellers have arranged for a ride beforehand with one of the many shuttle services listed on San Miguel de Allende and Guanajuato tourist websites. The average price is about $30 to 40 per person.
Car rental: Hertz and Budget have rental counters at the airport.
Intercity bus: The cheaper method to travel to other cities is Autobus. Primera Plus used to have a ticket counter at the airport, which has been closed for a while. An airport taxi from the airport to Querétaro Centro (central bus station) is about $20. From Centro, travelers can take another bus to any part of Mexico.

Other facilities
Regional Cargo has its headquarters on the airport property and in Colón. Universidad Nacional Aeronáutica en Querétaro has a facility on the grounds of the airport. On 31 August 2012, Aeromexico and Delta Air Lines announced that they will be building a maintenance base at Querétaro International airport.

Statistics

Passengers

Busiest routes

References

External links

  
 

2004 establishments in Mexico
Airports established in 2004
Airports in Querétaro
Buildings and structures in Querétaro
Transportation in Querétaro